ENAV S.p.A. is an Italian joint-stock company which operates as an exclusive supplier of civil air navigation services in the Italian airspace. As an air navigation service provider (ANSP) it is responsible for the provision of air traffic control service (ATCS), flight information service (FIS), aeronautical information service (AIS), and issuing of weather forecasts for the airports and the airspace under its responsibility.

The company name ENAV was the former name of the public agency, acronym for "Ente Nazionale Assistenza al Volo". In 2001 the agency ENAV was transformed in ENAV S.p.A., a company owned by the Italian Treasury.

The company is controlled by the Ministry of Economy and Finance (53.28% of the share capital and is subject to the supervision of the National Civil Aviation Authority (ENAC) and the Ministry of Infrastructure and Transport.

It has been listed on the FTSE Italia Mid Cap Index of the Milan Stock Exchange since July 2016.

History 
The current company draws its origins from the Autonomous General Air Traffic Flight Assistance Company (AAAVTAG), established in 1981, following the demilitarization of air traffic control, which followed a sensational strike by air traffic controllers, currently all in force to the Air Force, which took place on October 19, 1979.

The AAAVTAG was a non-economic public body which in December 1996 was transformed into an economic public body, with the name of Ente Nazionale Assistenza alla Volo (ENAV).

To support the liberalization of air transport, the National Civil Aviation Authority (ENAC) was established in 1997, with the functions of Italian authority for technical regulation, certification and supervision in the civil aviation sector.

On 1 January 2001, ENAV was transformed into a joint stock company fully owned by the public (ENAV S.p.A.). The company is owned by the Ministry of Economy and Finance and is subject to the supervision of ENAC and the Ministry of Infrastructure and Transport. The Court of Audit is responsible for checking the legitimacy of the company's financial management.

In April 2016, ENAV presented the application and documentation for listing to the Italian stock exchange and CONSOB. As of December 2022, the Ministry of Economy and Finance holds 53.28% of the share capital.

Shareholdings

Techno Sky 
In 2006 ENAV acquired from Vitrociset Techno Sky, the society for development and maintenance of the air traffic management technologies used by ENAV. Techno Sky projects installs and manage the air traffic control technologies for ENAV and others institutions in Italy and abroad.

Techno Sky operates in four area control centres (ACC) in Rome, Milan, Padua and Brindisi and in 4 airports, managing 44 radar systems, 121 telecommunications centres, 68 meteorological systems and 239 navigation aid systems (ILS, VOR, DME).

Other Shareholders 
The Group also includes IDS AirNav which deals with software and platforms for air traffic management, D-Flight, a company which deals with the creation of a platform for the management of drones and for the provision of UAV services.

Another ENAV Group company is ENAV Asia Pacific, a company incorporated under Malaysian law based in Kuala Lumpur, which manages ENAV's commercial activities in South-East Asia.

Finally, ENAV North Atlantic, a company incorporated under American law, which participates in the Aireon satellite project.

Area control centres 

ENAV operates four Area Control Centres (ACCs) in Rome, Milan, Padua and Brindisi managing the IFR air traffic in the Italian flight information region (FIR).

Control towers 

ENAV operates control towers of 44 airports in Italy, managing departures, landings, and ground movements.

International Cooperation 
ENAV is part of the European Commission's initiative to develop the Single European Sky, i.e. the integrated air route management system.

The company is also a member of EUROCONTROL, the civil and military organization made up of 41 states whose mission is to develop and maintain an efficient air traffic control system together with the national civil aviation authorities (in Italy ENAC), the suppliers of air traffic control services (in Italy ENAV and the Italian Air Force), users of civil and military airspace, industry, professional organizations and European institutions.

Top Management 
Chronology of top management.

References

External links
 ENAV S.p.A. Official website
 Techno Sky Official website

Air traffic control
Air navigation service providers
Aviation authorities
Companies based in Rome
Companies established in 1982
Government-owned companies of Italy
Italian companies established in 1982